Holy Cross Church, Gleadless Valley, is a Church of England church building in the City of Sheffield, England. It is situated on Spotswood Mount and is a distinctive building constructed in 1964/65 and designed by the architects Braddock & Martin-Smith. It is positioned in a spectacular position among the houses on the Rollestone hillside. It has a canted front which is triangular in shape which has a large white cross at its apex. The interior features full height stained glass windows of the Virgin Mary and St John by John Baker.

The church appeared in the 2006 series This Is England written by Shane Meadows.

References

External links

Official website

Churches completed in 1965
20th-century Church of England church buildings
Gleadless Valley, Holy Cross Church
Gleadless Valley, Holy Cross Church
Commissioners' church buildings
1965 establishments in England